National Route 372 is a national highway of Japan connecting Kameoka, Kyoto and Himeji, Hyōgo in Japan, with a total length of 102 km (63.38 mi).

References

National highways in Japan
Roads in Hyōgo Prefecture
Roads in Kyoto Prefecture